Spalacopsis filum is a species of beetle in the family Cerambycidae. It was described by Johann Christoph Friedrich Klug in 1829.

References

Spalacopsis
Beetles described in 1829